Thomas Robert "Tom" Filepp, better known by his stage name Cars & Trains, is an American multi-instrumentalist from Portland, Oregon, and the founder of indie label Circle Into Square Records. Sputnikmusic described him as "an excellent songwriter if anything else".

Career
Cars & Trains' first album, Rusty String, was released on his own label Circle Into Square in 2007. His second album, The Roots, the Leaves, was released on Fake Four Inc. in 2010. He released the third album, We Are All Fire, in early 2012. We Are All Storms, a companion EP to the album, was released later that year.

Discography

Studio albums
 Rusty String (2008)
 The Roots, the Leaves (2010)
 We Are All Fire (2012)
 Dust (2015)
 Fictions (due 2017)

Compilation albums
 Consumer Confidence Vol. 1 (2006)
 Consumer Confidence Vol. 2 (2007)

Remix albums
 The Roots, the Remix (2010)

Live albums
 Live on KBOO (2010)

EPs
 2AM (2006)
 Little Song (2008)
 We Are All Storms (2012)

Singles
 "The Sun Always Sets" b/w "The Leaves" (2010)

Guest appearances
 Factor – "Every Morning" from Lawson Graham (2010)
 Sole – "My Veganism" from No Wising Up No Settling Down (2013)

Productions
 Noah23 – "Nuts" from Fry Cook on Venus (2011)

References

External links
 
 

American multi-instrumentalists
Musicians from Portland, Oregon
Living people
Year of birth missing (living people)